Poetenes Evangelium is the debut solo album by Norwegian singer Morten Harket, released in 1993 on the label Kirkelig Kulturverksted.

Review 
The title translates into The gospel according to poets and was a follow-up from a book anthology of classical 20th century Norwegian poetry depicting the life and death of Christ. All 12 tracks are unedited poetry written by Norwegian authors Jens Bjørneboe, Inger Hagerup, Erik Fosnes Hansen, Kaj Skagen, Georg Johannesen, Arnold Eidslott and Håvard Rem. All music is composed by Øivind Varkøy for this album.

Track listing
 "Natten" (The Night) - 3:16
 "Hymne Til Josef" (Hymn to Joseph) - 5:03
 "Salome" - 3:48
 "Elisabeth Synger Ved Johannes Døperens Død" (Elisabeth Sings at the Death of John the Baptist) - 3:22
 "Fra Templet" (At the Temple) - 2:44
 "Hvor Krybben Stod" (Where the Cradle Stood) - 3:15
 "Rytteren" (The Rider) - 3:02
 "Sviket" (The Betrayal) - 3:55
 "Påske" (Easter) - 4:02
 "Den Fremmede" (The Stranger) - 3:30
 "Den Fremmede Taler Til Mennesket" (The Stranger Addresses Man) - 3:47
 "Engelen" (The Angel) - 3:58

Personnel 
Frode Alnæs - guitar
Kjetil Bjerkestrand - keyboards
Per Hillestad - drums
Kjetil Saunes - bass (tracks #11 & #12)

Strings
Bjørg Værnes - cello
Nora Taksdal - viola
Berit Værnes, Øyvor Volle - violin

Chamber choir
Oslo Kammerkor - conducted by Grethe Helgerød (tracks #6 & #12)

Credits 
Arranged by – Kjetil Bjerkestrand
Mastered by – Bjørn Engelmann
Music by – Øivind Varkøy
Producer & additional recordings – Erik Hillestad
Additional recordings – Ulf Holand
Recorded & mixed by – Jan Erik Kongshaug

References 

1993 debut albums
Morten Harket albums